Patrick O'Moore (1909–1983) was an Irish actor who appeared in a variety of American films and television shows.  A character actor, he appeared in a number of Hollywood's British-themed films during the 1940s and 1950s.

Selected filmography

 Evensong (1934)
 Kathleen Mavourneen (1937)
 Smilin' Through (1941)
 Desperate Journey (1942)
 'Springtime in the Rockies (1942)
 Captains of the Clouds (1942)
 Sahara (1943)
 Assignment in Brittany (1943)
 The Moon Is Down (1943)
 Tonight We Raid Calais (1943)
 Stage Door Canteen (1943)
 Between Two Worlds (1944)
 Molly and Me (1945)
 Conflict (1945)
 Tonight and Every Night (1945)
 G.I. War Brides (1946)
 Cloak and Dagger (1946)
 To Each His Own (1946)
 Rendezvous 24 (1946)
 Moss Rose (1947)
 Bulldog Drummond at Bay (1947)
 Bulldog Drummond Strikes Back (1947)
 The Two Mrs. Carrolls (1947)
 The Exile (1947)
 The Fighting O'Flynn (1949)
 Thunder on the Hill (1951)
 The 13th Letter (1951)
 Thunder on the Hill (1951)
 The Highwayman (1951)
 The Son of Dr. Jekyll (1951)
 Kind Lady (1951)
 At Sword's Point (1952)
 Million Dollar Mermaid (1952)
 Bwana Devil (1952)
 Niagara (1953)
 Titanic (1953)
 Dangerous When Wet (1953)
 Rogue's March (1953)
 The Desert Rats (1953)
 Jungle Gents (1954)
 Khyber Patrol (1954)
 The Sea Chase (1955)
 Moonfleet (1955)
 The Virgin Queen (1955)
 The Black Whip (1956)
 Copper Sky (1957)
 Trooper Hook (1957)
 The Unknown Terror (1957)
 Desert Hell (1958)
 Cattle Empire (1958)
 Blood Arrow (1958)
 The Rookie (1959)
 How to Succeed in Business Without Really Trying (1967)
 The Resurrection of Zachary Wheeler (1971)
 The Mechanic (1972)
 The Sword and the Sorcerer (1982)

References

Bibliography
 Keaney, Michael F. Film Noir Guide: 745 Films of the Classic Era, 1940-1959. McFarland, 2003.
 Raw, Laurence. Character Actors in Horror and Science Fiction Films, 1930-1960. McFarland, 2014.

External links

1909  births
1983 deaths
People from Dublin (city)
Irish male film actors
Irish emigrants to the United States